Seremban–Port Dickson Highway, SPDH, is an expressway in Negeri Sembilan, Malaysia. It was built to shorten the travelling distance from Seremban to Port Dickson and acts as an alternative route for Federal Route 53 which has dangerous corners along the route. Today the expressway is a part of PLUS Expressways network. The expressway may be integrated into the Malacca Strait Bridge in the future.

Route background
The expressway shares its Kilometre Zero with the old Seremban–Port Dickson Road FT53; hence, the expressway begins at KM7 of Mambau Interchange near Seremban.

Tolls
The Seremban–Port Dickson Highway (SPDH) implements an opened toll system. Tolls only have to be paid when entering the expressway, except when travelling to Seremban, where tolls will be collected at the Mambau Toll Plaza.

Electronic Toll Collections
As part of an initiative to facilitate faster dissipation of traffic at both Mambau and Lukut Toll Plazas, all toll transactions will be conducted electronically via PLUSMiles cards, Touch 'n Go cards or SmartTAGs starting 1 June 2015. Later, RFID, Malaysia's own radio-frequency identification was introduced in the toll plazas.

Mambau toll plaza (MBU)

Lukut toll plaza (LKT)

Note: Toll charges can only be paid with the Touch 'n Go and PLUSMiles cards or SmartTAG. Cash payment is not accepted.

List of interchanges and rest and service areas

See also
 North–South Expressway
 Malaysia Federal Route 53

External links
 PLUS Expressway Berhad
 PLUS
 Malaysian Highway Authority

1998 establishments in Malaysia
Expressways in Malaysia
North–South Expressway (Malaysia)